Trigger Pals is a 1939 American Western film directed by Sam Newfield.

Plot

Cast 
Art Jarrett as Lucky Morgan
Lee Powell as Stormy
Al St. John as Fuzzy
Dorothy Fay as Doris Allen
Ted Adams as Harvey Kent
Nina Guilbert as Minnie Archer
Stanley Blystone as Steve
Ernie Adams as Pete
Earl Douglas as Henchman Jake
Frank LaRue as Rancher Gates
Ethan Allen as Sheriff
Carl Mathews as Hank

External links 

1939 films
1930s English-language films
Grand National Films films
American black-and-white films
1939 Western (genre) films
American Western (genre) films
Films with screenplays by George H. Plympton
Films directed by Sam Newfield
1930s American films